Pakistan uses one time zone, which is Pakistan Standard Time (PKT). This is UTC+05:00 — that is, five hours ahead of Coordinated Universal Time.

History

Notation

Daylight saving time
Pakistan has experimented with Daylight Saving Time (DST) a number of times since 2002, shifting local time from UTC+05:00 to UTC+06:00 during various summer periods.
Daylight saving time in Pakistan has not been observed since 2009.

IANA time zone database
The IANA time zone database contains one zone for Pakistan in the file zone.tab, named Asia/Karachi.

References